Edmond Lekaj (born 25 August 1994) is a Swiss professional footballer of Kosovan descent who currently plays as a midfielder for FC Prishtina Bern.

References

External links
Uefa.com

1994 births
Swiss people of Kosovan descent
Footballers from Bern
Living people
Swiss men's footballers
Association football midfielders
FC Thun players
Swiss Super League players
Swiss 1. Liga (football) players
2. Liga Interregional players